Helal Saeed Humaid Saeed Al Saeed (born 12 May 1977), simply known as Helal Saeed is an Emirati professional footballer playing as a midfielder.

External links
 Arabian Gulf League profile
 
 

1977 births
Living people
Association football midfielders
Emirati footballers
Al Ain FC players
Al Jazira Club players
UAE Pro League players
United Arab Emirates international footballers
2007 AFC Asian Cup players